Bokor is a Hungarian surname that may refer to
Elemér Bokor (1887–1928), Hungarian entomologist
Jeffrey Bokor, American engineer
Jozsef Bokor, Hungarian scientist
Marián Bokor (born 1977), Slovakian javelin thrower
Margit Bokor (1903?–1949), Hungarian soprano
Pál Bokor (born 1942), Hungarian journalist, writer and translator

Hungarian-language surnames